Disorder is a 2009 Chinese documentary film directed by Huang Weikai  and distributed by dGenerate Films.

Synopsis
Huang Weikai assembles footage from a dozen amateur videographers and weaves them into a unique symphony of urban social dysfunction.

External links 
 Official Site
 
  Disorder at the San Diego Asian Film Festival

2009 films
Chinese documentary films
Documentary films about China
2009 documentary films
Documentary films about cities